The Philippine Air Force Aerospace Museum is an aerospace museum located within the premises of Colonel Jesus Villamor Air Base in Pasay, Philippines.

History
The museum was founded as the Marcos Museum in 2 May 1974. The museum at its current location opened in June 2007.

Exhibits
The museum exhibits are divided into several sections. These include a heritage section, a science and technology section, an art corner and the Aircraft Park. The heritage section's collection includes galleries of weapons, uniforms, dioramas, miniatures, and memorabilia related to early Philippine military aviation. Artifacts related to the March 1974 surrender of Japanese holdout Hiroo Onoda, such as his sword, rifle and personal equipment, are on display here. The science and technology exhibits include aircraft mock-ups and miniatures, indoor static aircraft displays and experimental projects of the Philippine Air Force.

When the Balangiga bells were repatriated on 11 December 2018, these were exhibited for public viewing at the museum for two days prior to being returned to Eastern Samar.

The Aircraft Park is an outdoor facility that displays retired aircraft that had been used by the Philippine Air Force throughout its history. The static indoor display and Aircraft Park collection includes the following:

See also
Armed Forces of the Philippines Museum
Philippine Army Museum

References

Aerospace museums
Military and war museums in the Philippines
Museums in the Philippines